Exit Ten is the first EP by the British progressive metal band Exit Ten.

Track listing
  "Absence Of Forgiveness"   – 5:25  
  "Paralisé"  – 3:25  
  "Sold Out"  – 4:07  
  "Sound Of BC"  – 3:38

Credits
 Ryan Redman  - Vocals
 Stuart Steele  - Guitar
 Joe Ward - Guitar 
 James Steele - Bass
 Chris Steele - Drums
 Mark Williams - Production

Exit Ten albums
2004 EPs